Gökhan Gönül (born 4 January 1985) is a Turkish professional footballer who plays as a right back for TFF First League club Çaykur Rizespor.

Early life
Gönül was born in Bafra, Samsun, where he and his family lived before moving to Bursa when Gönül was six years old. His uncle signed him up with Bursayolspor's youth squad in 1999, and Gönül began his footballing career as a goalkeeper. However, after several other young goalkeepers signed with the club, Gönül was moved to the outfield. After putting in several performances, Gönül was told he would not play goalkeeper again. At first, Gönül played football as a hobby and something to play when there was nothing else to do. He began taking the sport more seriously when his coach at the time, Mehmet Kirazoğlu, took him under his wing and trained him individually. Soon after, Gönül played in a senior match against 30-year-olds; Gönül was 13 at the time.

Gönül played several positions before he could find his spot, lacing up as a libero, midfielder, and forward at various levels. Gönül was the captain of the 14-16 team at Bursayolspor, and helped the club to a 3-3 draw with Bursaspor, scoring three goals while playing libero. Hasan Bora, a staff member at Bursaspor at the time, was interested in signing Gönül after his performance. However, after seeing several of his peers join the club and fail to progress, Gönül took it as a sign and decided against joining the club. Fatih Terim, then coach of Galatasaray, also expressed interest in Gönül. He invited the youngster to Istanbul, but Gönül ultimately did not agree to join the team. Instead, he signed with Gençlerbirliği on 9 August 2002.

Career
Gönül began his career with the Ankara-based club in the A2 league. In his first season, he scored two goals in 19 A2 league appearances. The following season, Gönül was loaned out to feeder club Hacettepe. He spent the 2003–04 season on loan, before joining the club on a full transfer at the end of the season. In his first two seasons with the club, Gönül scored eight goals in 48 appearances and helped the club to back-to-back promotions. Gençlerbirliği transferred him back to the club at the start of the 2005–06. However, an injury kept him sidelined for several months and he was unable to make his debut for the club. Instead, he was loaned out once more to Hacettepe at the winter break. Gönül helped the club to another promotion, completing three promotions in four years. He also won the award for Best Player of the TFF First League. 

Fenerbahçe transferred him before the start of the 2007–08 season, where he flourished under then-coach Zico. After putting in performances during the 2007–08 UEFA Champions League, he earned the nickname "Turkish Cafu". The club reached the quarter-finals of the UEFA Champions League for the first time in club history. Gökhan Gönül extended to his contract in June 2012. The new deal will see him at the club until the 2015–16 and take home €1.7 million per season.

International career

Gönül was never capped at youth international level. He made his senior debut against Norway on 27 November 2007. He made three more appearances that season, but was not selected in the Euro 2008 squad due to his injury.

Gönül was called up to the Turkey squad for Euro 2016.

Honours
Fenerbahçe S.K.
Süper Lig: 2010–11, 2013-14
Turkish Cup: 2011–12, 2012–13
Turkish Super Cup: 2007, 2009, 2014

Beşiktaş J.K.
Süper Lig: 2016–17

Career statistics

Club

International

International goals
Scores and results list Turkey's goal tally first.

Notes

References

External links

Gökhan Gönül at Fenerbahce.org

1985 births
Living people
People from Bafra
Turkish footballers
Turkey international footballers
Turkey under-21 international footballers
Gençlerbirliği S.K. footballers
Hacettepe S.K. footballers
Fenerbahçe S.K. footballers
Beşiktaş J.K. footballers
Çaykur Rizespor footballers
Süper Lig players
TFF First League players
UEFA Euro 2016 players
Association football fullbacks